This is a complete list of fellows of the Royal Society elected in its second year, 1661.

Fellows 
Elias Ashmole (1617–1692)
John Gauden (1605–1662)
Francis Glisson (1597–1677)
Sir Robert Harley (1626–1673)
Mungo Murray (1599–1670)
Thomas Pockley (d. 1661)
George Villiers (1628–1687)
Richard White (b.1661)

References

1661
1661 in science
1661 in England